"Johnny Jump Up" is an Irish drinking song by Tadhg Jordan from County Cork. It was first popularized by Jimmy Crowley, and then brought to a wider audience by Christy Moore.

Johnny Jump Up is a strong cider, apparently made stronger by being stored in old whiskey barrels. The song contains numerous local Cork references such as "Up The Lee Road," where a psychiatric hospital was located.

References

External links
 Lyrics at Christy Moore's web site, from Jimmy Crowley

Drinking songs
Year of song unknown
Irish songs